Axel Weber may refer to:

 Axel Weber (athlete) (1954–2001), German pole vaulter
 Axel A. Weber (born 1957), German economist, professor and banker